Alqar may refer to:
 Pir Alqar
 Elqar, South Khorasan